The Vamp is a musical comedy with music by James Mundy; lyrics by John La Touche; and a musical book by La Touche and Sam Locke which is based on a story by La Touche. The musical opened on Broadway on November 10, 1955 at the Winter Garden Theatre where it ran for a total of 60 performances until it closed on December 31, 1955. The production was directed by David Alexander, choreographed by Robert Alton, used set and costume designs by Raoul Pène Du Bois, and conducted by musical director Milton Rosenstock. 

The cast was led by Jack Waldron as Myron H. Hubbard, Bibi Osterwald as Bessie Bisco, Steve Reeves as Muscle Man and Samson, Paul Lipson as Barney Ostertag, Jack Harrold as Bluestone, Carol Channing as Flora Weems, David Atkinson as Oliver J. Oxheart, and Malcolm Lee Beggs as Stark Clayton. Alton, Channing, and Rosenstock all received Tony Award nominations for their work on the show.

References

External links

1955 musicals
Broadway musicals